The House That Jack Built is a 1900 British short silent drama film, directed by George Albert Smith, featuring a boy who knocks over a house made of bricks built by his sister and then rebuilds it when the original sequence is shown in reverse. "In addition to exploiting a popular cinematic trick," of, "reversing the film in the projector," and, "its audience's presumed knowledge of the technique," the director, according to Michael Brooke of BFI Screenonline, "was continuing his experiments with narrative forms," with the reversed sequence,  "interpreted as wish-fulfilment on the part of the girl, hoping that time will literally turn back on itself to allow her house to be rebuilt," he, "demonstrates that while this is impossible in reality, it is easily achievable in cinema."

References

External links

1900 films
1900s British films
British black-and-white films
British silent short films
1900 drama films
1900 short films
British drama films
Films directed by George Albert Smith
Articles containing video clips
Silent drama films